Cambridge City Council may refer to:

 Cambridge City Council, England
 Cambridge City Council, Massachusetts, USA
 Cambridge, Ontario City Council, Canada